"I Just Wanna" is a song by the American rock band Kiss from their 1992 studio album Revenge. It was also released as the album's promotional single.

Background and writing 
"I Just Wanna" is the 11th track on the Kiss 1992 studio album Revenge.

The song was written by Paul Stanley and Vinnie Vincent. The latter also co-wrote two other songs on the album.

Music video 
The music video was directed by Paul Rachman, Rachman was also the director of two more videos from Revenge: "Unholy" and "Domino".

He recounted in an interview with Songfacts:

Composition 
In the chorus Stanley repeats "I just wanna f..." a couple of times until he finally completes the phrase "I just wanna forget you".

Personnel
Paul Stanley – lead vocals, rhythm guitar
Bruce Kulick – lead guitar, E-Bow, backing vocals
Eric Singer – drums, backing vocals
Gene Simmons – bass

with
Tommy Thayer – backing vocals
Jesse Damon – backing vocals

Charts

References

External links 
 "I Just Wanna" at Songfacts
 "I Just Wanna" at Discogs

1992 songs
1992 singles
Kiss (band) songs
Mercury Records singles
Songs written by Paul Stanley
Songs written by Vinnie Vincent